was a Japanese singer and actor.

Music career

Also known as Sho-Ken, he was the lead singer of The Tempters,  which was a blues-rock band connected to the Group Sounds scene, and gained big hits in the late 1960s. Hagiwara was known for his good looks and wild vocals, which appealed to young male and female fans. After The Tempters, he formed the band PYG along with Kenji Sawada, the first true Japanese supergroup, a unit which included members of The Tigers, The Tempters, and The Spiders. He was in the Donjuan R&R Band with Hideki Ishima, formerly of The Flowers Travelln' Band.

Acting career 

After being highly praised for his acting in the film The Rendezvous (1972), he appeared in many films and television shows, including many films directed by Tatsumi Kumashiro and such hit TV dramas as Taiyō ni hoero!, Kizudarake no tenshi, and Zenryaku ofukurosama. He was still popular as an actor in the early 2000s,.

Death 
On 26 March 2019, Hagiwara died of a gastrointestinal stromal tumor at the age of 68 in a hospital in Tokyo. He had been fighting the disease since 2011, but declined to publicize the name of the illness.

Filmography

Film

Television

See also 
 The Rolling Stones
 The Beatles
 Blues rock
 Rock music
 Blues

References

External links 
 

1950 births
2019 deaths
Japanese male actors
Japanese male singers
People from Saitama (city)
Musicians from Saitama Prefecture
Deaths from cancer in Japan
Deaths from small intestine cancer